A multiple-language version film, often abbreviated to MLV, is a film, especially from the early talkie era, produced in several different languages for international markets. To offset the marketing restrictions of making sound films in only one language, it became common practice for American and European studios to produce foreign-language versions of their films using the same sets, crew, costumes, etc. The first foreign-language versions appeared in 1929 and largely replaced the International Sound Version method for many major releases. The most common languages used for these productions were English, Spanish, French and German.

Musicals in particular proliferated during the early talkie era, partially because between-song, plot-driven narration could often be easily replaced with intertitles or, as in the case with MLVs, be reshot using local actors. Numerous internationally renowned artists worked on MLVs, some repeatedly. Many are still widely known to modern audiences, including Marlene Dietrich, Greta Garbo, Alfred Hitchcock, Buster Keaton, Fritz Lang and John Wayne. Hal Roach was a great proponent of MLVs and an early adopter of the practice. Within a two-year period between 1929 and 1931 he oversaw the production of many of them for his top acts, including  Laurel and Hardy, Charley Chase, Harry Langdon and Our Gang.

Although a vast number of MLVs were made, many of the early export versions are thought lost and relatively few are available today. Some notable exceptions are Anna Christie (1930); The Blue Angel (1930); Dracula'''s Spanish-language incarnation, Drácula (1931); M (1931); The Threepenny Opera (1931) and various Laurel and Hardy films.

Within a few years the practice had peaked, largely because of the additional production complications and expenses incurred, along with improvements in dubbing and subtitling techniques. Many multiple-language version films were US-European co-productions and the Nazis' rise to power in the early 1930s effectively sealed their fate. European co-productions continued on a reduced scale through until the end of the 1950s before dying out almost completely. In India however, multiple-language versions are still produced on a semi-regular basis, particularly in the case of big budget epics.

List of multiple-language versions

See also
 Symphony in Two Flats'', a 1930 British drama film with two versions, one starring Benita Hume (as "Lesley Fullerton") for the UK release and the other starring Jacqueline Logan (as "Leslie Fullerton") for the US release
 Hinterland (TV series)
 Part-talkie
 Sound film
 History of film
 List of early Warner Bros. talking features
 List of multilingual Indian films
 Pan-Indian film
 List of longest films in India

References

External links
 Multiple-Language Version Film Collectors' Guide at Brenton Film

Audiovisual introductions in 1929
1920s in film
1930s in film
Sound recording
 
 
 Multiple language version